Puncak or Puncak Pass (Indonesian for "top" or "peak") is a mountain pass in West Java, Indonesia. The pass connects the city of Bogor and Bandung, and is spread within the regencies of Bogor, Cianjur, and Sukabumi. Puncak Pass is located between Mt. Gede-Pangrango in the south, and the Jonggol Mountains in the north. The highest point of the pass is about 1500 m altitude.

Puncak is a large conglomeration of districts in Bogor Regency, such as Cisarua, Ciawi, Megamendung, Cipanas, etc. All of those districts are unified by the main road, Jalan Raya Puncak.

History
Puncak is the name of a pass on the Indonesian island of Java, between Bogor and Bandung.

The highland, being cooler than Jakarta, is a popular resort area for the inhabitants of Jakarta who are looking for cooler air. Many Swiss-type chalets were built around Puncak during the pre-World War II colonial period. Today Puncak Pass is surrounded by hotels and resorts.

Tourism
Puncak rests within the mountains between Bandung and Bogor. Many tourists visit this area of West Java to escape the heat and busy city areas.

Puncak is known for its individual private resorts/villas, which can be rented out for individual or group bookings. Schools and companies organize group outings, business conferences, and trainings in those resorts.

There are a number of tea plantations on either side of the main Puncak road, and the activities available here include paragliding, tea plantation walking, or just relaxing with the views.

Puncak has served as a location for films, including the 1984 German-Indonesia production .

In addition, Puncak also has several landmarks and tourist attractions, such as Puncak Pass and Kota Bunga. Another tourist attraction, just south of the pass, is the Cibodas Botanical Garden. Taman Safari, a wildlife park, is also located in Puncak. There is a volcanic lake Telaga Warna near the main route.

Developments
Bogor Regency is planning to build an alternative route from Sentul International Circuit-Babakan Madang-Hambalang-Sukmamakmur-Cipanas Palace, Pacet with total length of 47 kilometers, and a carriageway 30 meters wide. Most of the land will be granted by businessmen such as Probosutedjo and Tommy Suharto. The construction was planned to commence in 2011 and was scheduled to be partly finished in 2013.

References

External links

Geography of West Java
Mountain passes of Asia